Qiwang may refer to:

Qiwang (Go), a Chinese Go competition from 1989 to 2001
South-West Qiwang, a Go competition in China
Weifu Fangkai Cup, or Qiwang,, a Go competition in China
The Chess Master(), a 1984 Chinese novel by Ah Cheng
Chess King (film), a 1988 Chinese film based on Ah Cheng's novel
Qi Wang (psychologist), American psychologist and academic

See also
Prince of Qi (disambiguation)
Wang Qi (disambiguation)